Hammers of Misfortune is an American heavy metal band from San Francisco, California. The band's style has varied from album to album, at times incorporating different elements of folk metal, doom metal, NWOBHM, black metal, 1970s rock, and thrash metal. It is the brainchild of guitarist John Cobbett, who serves as the band's producer and primary songwriter.

History
Hammers of Misfortune was formed in the mid-1990s under the name Unholy Cadaver. At the time, the only members were guitarist John Cobbett and drummer Chewy Marzolo, both of whom shared vocal duties. Enlisting the help of other musicians, among them Mike Scalzi of Slough Feg, they recorded a full album's worth of material in their rehearsal space. However, only three of these nine tracks were included on the band's aptly titled Demo No. 1, and the majority of the material remained unreleased until 2011, when Shadow Kingdom Records released the entire recording as the Unholy Cadaver LP. Unholy Cadaver's output laid the groundwork for what would become Hammers of Misfortune's signature style, but it also contained elements of death metal (mainly in John Cobbett's vocals) that would be phased out in future recordings.

In 2000, the band changed its name to Hammers of Misfortune, taking its moniker from a track on the Unholy Cadaver demo. Recruiting Scalzi and Janis Tanaka (formerly of Fireball Ministry and L7), the band released its 2001 concept album The Bastard on Tumult Records. The Bastard received many positive reviews in the metal community, including several "best of 2001" awards from magazines such as Terrorizer and Lamentations Of The Flame Princess.

In 2003 the band signed a deal with Cruz Del Sur Music, releasing their second album The August Engine by the end of the same year. This album was also well received by the metal community, getting a 10/10 review from Brave Words & Bloody Knuckles magazine among other acclamations. After The August Engine, Janis Tanaka left the band and was replaced by Jamie Myers.

After The Locust Years, there was a large lineup change. Mike Scalzi left the band, in order to focus on his main band, Slough Feg, and Jamie Myers left the band in order to raise a family. Scalzi was replaced by Patrick Goodwin, and Jesse Quattro replaced Myers. The original drummer, Chewy, left and rejoined the band. With this new lineup, the band recorded the double album, Fields/Church of Broken Glass, in 2008. However, this lineup was not to last, as Quattro and Goodwin parted ways with the band in 2010. Cobbett subsequently recruited guitarist/vocalist Leila Abdul-Rauf and lead vocalist Joe Hutton.

In March 2010, Hammers of Misfortune announced that they had signed a record deal with Metal Blade Records. Since then, Metal Blade has re-released The Bastard, The August Engine, The Locust Years, and Fields/Church of Broken Glass. In October 2011, the band produced their fifth studio album, 17th Street, which was well-received by critics, with positive reviews from Pitchfork, AllMusic, The Quietus, and PopMatters.

The band's sixth album, Dead Revolution, was released in the summer of 2016 following a long hiatus, during which Cobbett and keyboardist Sigrid Sheie had a child and Hutton recovered from a motorcycle accident while other band members were involved with various side projects. Cobbett mentioned "technology and gentrification" as two of the subjects he thought about during the writing of the album.

Band members

Current
 John Cobbett – guitars (ex-Gwar, ex-Slough Feg, Ludicra, Amber Asylum, Jarboe, Malefice (DC), VHÖL)
 Joe Hutton  (The Worship of Silence) – vocals
 Leila Abdul-Rauf (Saros, Amber Asylum) – guitar, vocals
 Sigrid Sheie  (Amber Asylum, VHÖL) keyboards, vocals
 Paul Walker (The Worship of Silence) – bass
 Will Carroll (Death Angel, The Cutthroats 9) – drums

Former
 Janis Tanaka – bass, vocals
 Mike Scalzi – guitars, vocals
 Jamie Myers – bass, vocals
 Ron Nichols – bass
 Patrick Goodwin – guitar, vocals
 Jesse Quattro – vocals
 Max Barnett – bass
 Chewy Marzolo – drums

Albums discography 
 Unholy Cadaver (1998) - as Unholy Cadaver
 The Bastard (2001)
 The August Engine (2003)
 The Locust Years (2006)
 Fields/Church of Broken Glass (2008)
 17th Street (2011)
 Dead Revolution (2016)
 Overtaker (2022)

References

External links
The Bastard on Tumult Records

American progressive metal musical groups
Musical groups established in 2000
Tumult Records artists
Profound Lore Records artists
Metal Blade Records artists